Rita Jackson Samuels (April 25, 1945March 27, 2018) was an activist in the Women's rights and Civil rights movements. She worked as a secretary for the Southern Christian Leadership Conference and participated in the 1965 Selma to Montgomery march. She was the first African-American woman to serve on the staff of the governor of Georgia, then-governor Jimmy Carter. Samuels later served as a White House consultant during the Carter administration. In 1980, Samuels founded the Georgia Coalition of Black Women and served as executive director. She was the first African-American to serve on the Georgia State Election Board. In 2010, she was inducted into the International Civil Rights Walk of Fame.

References

1945 births
2018 deaths
African-American women
Activists for African-American civil rights
American women's rights activists
People from Forsyth, Georgia
21st-century African-American women
21st-century African-American people
20th-century African-American women
20th-century African-American people